Collins is a city in Covington County, Mississippi, United States. The population was 2,586 at the 2010 census. It is the county seat of Covington County.

History

From Williamsburg Depot to Collins
Collins was originally incorporated as Williamsburg Depot in 1899. The Gulf and Ship Island Railroad had completed construction, and bypassed Williamsburg, the county seat at that time. The sawmills moved to the new town of Williamsburg Depot in order to be closer to the railroad. As lumber was an important industry during the time, the town moved with them. Not long after, Williamsburg Depot grew to a town of 6,000 - 7,000 people.

Eventually, the difficulties of having such a long town name, Williamsburg Depot, became clear. The length caused many people to write it over their stamps, voiding the postage. In order to correct this issue, the postmaster asked to have the town name changed in 1905, and the postal service came up with a short and easy name "Bad". For reasons that may be clear, the residents rejected this name, and eventually came up with Collins, in honor of Fred W. Collins, leader of the state's Republican party and U. S. Marshal for the Southern District of Mississippi. The town's name was officially changed on November 24, 1906.

Becoming the county seat

In 1906, a portion of the west side of Covington County became Jefferson Davis County. As a result, Williamsburg lost its position at the center of the county, and a new county seat was needed. Collins eventually emerged over Seminary and Ora, Mississippi, and a new county courthouse was built. The first court place was held in 1908.

Decline and resurgence
Eventually, the lumber industry in Collins exhausted the timber resources and moved. The town population dwindled from 7,000 to 700. However, industry began to return to the town in 1936 when U.S. 49 and U.S. 84 were built, putting the town at the crossroads of these two major highways. In addition, the Plantation Pipeline was run from Baton Rouge to the east coast. It passed through the community of Kola, which was soon annexed by Collins.

Hurricane Katrina and Duryea Adopt-A-Town
In September 2005, Hurricane Katrina struck Collins. As most aid agencies were concentrating on major metropolitan areas such as New Orleans, small towns like Collins were seemingly overlooked. Duryea, Pennsylvania, which had experienced similar flooding as the result of Hurricane Agnes in 1972, sought a town similar in size and demographics to "adopt" and help rebuild after the devastation wrought by the largest natural disaster in the history of the town. By hosting a bazaar and through other various fundraising efforts, Duryea helped rebuild. Collins Mayor V.O. Smith and his wife, Ada, flew to Duryea to thank their mayor Keith Moss, organizer Trina Moss and the townspeople of Duryea. This led to a bond between the two towns and has included several visits to both towns.

Geography
Collins is located near the center of Covington County, along the southwest side of Okatoma Creek, a tributary of the Bowie River and part of the Pascagoula River watershed.

Demographics

2020 census

As of the 2020 United States census, there were 2,342 people, 905 households, and 661 families residing in the city.

2010 census
As of the census of 2010, there were 2,586 people, 910 households, and 597 families residing in the city. The population density was 324.9 people per square mile (125.5/km2). There were 1,026 housing units at an average density of 128.9 per square mile (49.8/km2). The racial makeup of the city was 44.2% White, 51.1% African American, 0.01% Native American, 0.03% Asian, 3.4% from other races, and 0.9% from two or more races. Hispanic or Latino of any race were 4.2% of the population.

There were 910 households, out of which 65.6% had children under the age of 18 living with them, 34.1% were husband and wife couples living together, 27.1% had a female householder with no husband present, and 34.3% were non-families. 30.5% of all households were made up of individuals. The average household size was 2.58 and the average family size was 3.23.

In the city, the population was spread out, with 27.3% under the age of 18, 9.9% from 18 to 24, 21.8% from 25 to 44, 18.4% from 45 to 64, and 22.6% who were 65 years of age or older. The median age was 37 years. For every 100 females, there were 88.1 males. For every 100 females age 18 and over, there were 87.4 males.

According to the 2000 Census, the city's language is mostly homogenous, with 2,280 (96.65%) of the population speaking English as at home. However, there are a marginal amount of Spanish (49 or 2.08%) and French (30 or 1.27%) speakers living in the city.

The median income for a household in the city was $22,661, and the median income for a family was $23,068. Males had a median income of $23,795 versus $16,250 for females. The per capita income for the city was $11,912. About 34.1% of families and 39.3% of the population were below the poverty line, including 59.3% of those under age 18 and 16.5% of those age 65 or over.

Arts and culture

Annual cultural events

Okatoma Festival
Named after the Okatoma Creek, which flows through the county, the Okatoma Festival is held the first Saturday in May. It is held in downtown Collins, and features carnival rides, vendor booths, and local cuisine. In addition, there is a 5K run held in the morning.

Mitchell Farms Pumpkin Patch
On Saturdays and Sundays, from the middle of September to the beginning of November, Mitchell Farms hosts the Mitchell Farms Pumpkin Patch & Maze. The event consists of many attractions, such as wagon rides, corn maze, animal barn, and a goat castle.

Christmas in the Park
From the day after Thanksgiving to the day after Christmas, the Chamber of Commerce hosts "Christmas in the Park". This is a massive, drive through light display that takes up the entirety of Bettie D. Robertson Memorial Park. All items in the display are donations from local individuals. It features secular and religious aspects of the holiday.

The city has recently come under scrutiny as a result of this display. On October 19, 2015, the Freedom from Religion Foundation sent a letter to the City of Collins, on behalf of a local citizen, asking for displays of a religious nature to be removed from the Bettie D. Robertson City Park. The letter stated that, among other things, permanent displays of 3 Latin crosses, a statue of Jesus carrying a cross, and a globe with City of Collins displayed above Matthew 8:12 "I am the Light of the World" are unconstitutional and "tremendously un-welcoming to non-Christians". It asks for immediate removal of the displays from Bettie D. Robertson Park. The letter was met with great hostility from the citizens, with some calling for the complainant to leave the county.

Tourism
The city features Grand Paradise Water Park. In addition, Mitchell Farms offers tours of the original farm buildings and event planning services, in addition to seasonal fruits and vegetables. Okatoma Golf club provides an 18-hole course in Oak Hills Subdivision.

Parks and recreation
There are two major parks in the city of Collins: Bettie D. Robertson and Westside Park. Robertson Park is home to Christmas in the Park, and features athletic fields, a walking track and playground. There is also a duck pond and bird sanctuary. Westside Park features basketball courts and a playground as well.

Education
The city of Collins is served Covington County School District. There are three schools within Collins:

 Collins Elementary (K-4)
 Carver Middle School (5-8)
 Collins High School (9-12)

The school district also has a Vocational Center located in Collins, that encompasses, but is not limited to, programs of study such as Health Sciences, Construction Trades, Teacher Academy, and Business & Marketing.

Media

The city is served by the News-Commercial, a local paper based out of Collins. The paper publishes every Wednesday. The Clarion-Ledger, a regional paper based in Jackson, is available as well.

Both WDAM and WHLT provide the city with local over-the-air television service. The former is based out of Laurel, MS, while the latter is based out of Hattiesburg, MS. There is not a local cable station located within the city.

Infrastructure

Transportation
The city of Collins lies near the intersection of two major highways, U.S. Routes 49 and 84.
U.S. 84 bypasses the center of the city, crossing U.S. 49 at an interchange in the northern part of the city, and leads east  to Laurel and west  to the vicinity of Brookhaven.

There is not a mass transit system in place in the city of Collins; as a result, many residents drive cars in their daily lives. However, there are sidewalks in many of the subdivisions around the city that link with the city center.

Utilities
The city is served by Southern Pines Electric Power Association, out of Taylorsville, MS.

Healthcare
The city is served by Covington County Hospital, a 25-bed critical access hospital that opened in 1951. The hospital is active in the community, funding local educational extra-curricular activities and after school programs.

Notable people
 Dana Andrews, film legend born on a farmstead near Collins, raised in Huntsville, Texas
 L. Venchael Booth, Baptist minister
 Correll Buckhalter, former NFL running back 
 Demario Davis, NFL linebacker
 Billy Hamilton, professional baseball player (Kansas City Royals)
 Dale Houston, singer
 Mack A. Jordan, United States Army soldier during the Korean War who was posthumously awarded the Medal of Honor
 Randolph Keys, NBA player
 Brandon McDonald, former NFL cornerback
 Gerald McRaney, actor
 Marilyn Mims, soprano with the Metropolitan Opera

References

External links

 City of Collins official website
 Covington County Chamber of Commerce

Cities in Mississippi
Cities in Covington County, Mississippi
County seats in Mississippi